The 2019 Fitzgibbon Cup was the 103rd staging of the Fitzgibbon Cup since its establishment by the Gaelic Athletic Association in 1912. It was sponsored by Electric Ireland, and known as the Electric Ireland HE GAA Fitzgibbon Cup for sponsorship purposes. The draw for the group stage fixtures took place on 5 December 2018. It started with the group stage on 20 January 2019 and is scheduled to end on 23 February 2019.

The University of Limerick were the defending champions, however, they failed to make it out of the "group of death".

On 23 February 2019, University College Cork won the Fitzgibbon Cup after a 2–21 to 0–13 defeat of Mary Immaculate College in the final. This was their 39th cup title overall and their first title since 2013.

NUI Galway's Evan Niland was the Fitzgibbon Cup top scorer with 0-54.

Group stage

Group A

Table

Fixtures and results

Group B

Table

Fixtures and results

Group C

Table

Fixtures and results

Group D

Table

Fixtures and results

Knockout stage

Quarter-finals

Semi-finals

Final

Top scorers

Top scorers overall

Top scorers in a single game

References

External links
 gaa.ie Higher Education Fixtures

Fitzgibbon
Fitzgibbon Cup